Mike Joyce (May 2, 1939 – August 28, 2020) was an American professional golfer. 

Joyce joined the Senior PGA Tour (now Champions Tour) in 1989, winning once, the 1992 GTE Northwest Classic. He played regularly on the Tour from 1989 to 1996 and last appeared in 2001.

Joyce's youngest brother Kevin was a member of the United States national basketball team at the 1972 Summer Olympics.

Professional wins (4)

Regular career wins (3)
1982 Long Island Open
1983 Long Island PGA Championship
1988 Long Island PGA Championship

Senior PGA Tour wins (1)

References

External links

American male golfers
PGA Tour Champions golfers
Golfers from New York (state)
People from Huntington, New York
1939 births
2020 deaths